Rios, Ríos or Riós are Spanish, Portuguese, and Galician surnames. The name has numerous origins. In Germany, Italy, France, UK, and the Americas the Ríos surname can also be found in the surname history books . The name was derived from the Spanish word "Rio," which means "river" (pronounced: Ree-Oess).
 
The surname Ríos is a rich sign of ancestry which includes royals and nobles . Historians believe the Ríos family derived from the Royal House of Asturias and King Liuvigilds Dynasty . The original bearer of the name Ríos, which is a local surname, once lived, held land, or was born in the region of Northwestern Spain which is today's Galicia and Asturias . In the Middle Ages, names originally denoted the proprietorship of the village or estate.The Ríos Family originally lived near a river . As early as the 10th Century, the Ríos family has been involved in political reform, business, military, Christianity, athletics, music, education, science, law, medicine, arts, architecture, literature, technology, inventions, mathematics, engineering and economic investments .

Some of the Ríos spelling variants are: Ríós, Riós, Rios, de Ríos, de los Ríos, de Ríós, de los Ríós, de Rios, de los Rios, Río, Rio, del Ríó, del Río, del Rio.

People with the name
 Alfonso Bernardo de los Ríos y Guzmán (1626 – 5 October 1692) was a Roman Catholic prelate who served as Archbishop of Granada (1677–1692), Bishop of Ciudad Rodrigo (1671–1677), and Bishop of Santiago de Cuba (1668–1669).
  (1868-1928), Spanish architect, urban planner and historian
 Abelardo Ríos (born 1952), Colombian cyclist
 Adolfo Ríos (born 1966), Mexico National Team goalkeeper
 Alberto Ríos (born 1952), American academic, author and poet
 Alex Ríos (born 1981), Puerto Rican baseball player
 Alexei Rios (born 1987), Belarusian footballer
 Ana María Sánchez de Ríos (born 1959), Peruvian diplomat
 Andrés Castro Ríos (1942–2006), Puerto Rican poet
 Andrés Ríos (born 1989), Argentine footballer
 Ángel Fernández de los Ríos (1821–1880), Spanish politician, writer, editor, and historian
  (1865–1917), road, canal and port engineer
 Antonella Ríos (born 1974), Chilean television and film actress
 Antonio de los Ríos y Rosas (1812–1873), Spanish politician
  (1887-1980), Spanish teacher, writer and politician of agrarian and Galician tendency who presided over the Council of Galicia
 Antonio Ríos (born 1988), Mexican footballer
 Antonio Rios de Amorim (born 1969), Portuguese magnate, Chairman CEO of Corticeira Amorim
 Anthony "Tony" P. Ríos (1914-1999), American political organizer and civil rights activist
 Ariel Rios (1954–1982), undercover special agent for the United States Bureau of Alcohol, Tobacco, Firearms and Explosives (ATF)
 Armando Ríos (born 1971), Puerto Rican baseball player
 Armando Ríos Piter (born 1973), Mexican politician who currently serves as a senator. and ran for president in 2018
 Augie Ríos (1946-2019) '¿Dónde Está Santa Claus? (Spanish for Where is Santa Claus?) is a novelty Christmas song. 12-year-old Augie Rios had a hit with the song in 1958 which featured the Mark Jeffrey Orchestra.
 Bernardo Ríos (born 1959) Colombian artist
 Bernardo Giner de los Ríos (1888-1970), Spanish architect, politician, and writer of architectural books
 Birmania Ríos, American television journalist
 Blanca de los Ríos (1862-1956), Spanish writer and painter
 Bobby Ríos (born 1957), Puerto Rican basketball player
 Brandon Ríos (born 1986), American boxer
  (1742-1795), Spanish aristocrat, 6th Count of Fernán Núñez
  (1779–1822), VII count of Fernán Núñez and I duke of Fernán Núñez great of Spain, VI marquess of Castel-Moncayo, V marquess of  Alameda, XIX Mr of Higuera, Mr of Vargas great of Spain
 Carlos Torres Ríos (1898–1956), Argentine cinematographer, film director, screenwriter, film editor and film producer
 Carmelo Ríos (disambiguation), multiple people
 Catalina de los Ríos y Lisperguer (1604–1665), aristocratic 17th-century Chilean landowner, nicknamed La Quintrala
 Christopher Rios (1971–2000), better known by his stage name Big Pun, American rapper
 Carmelo Ríos (athlete) (born 1959), Puerto Rican long-distance runner
 Carmelo Ríos Santiago (born 1973), Puerto Rican politician
 César Ríos (born 1983), Mexican footballer
 Conchi Ríos (born 1991), Spanish bullfighter
  (1896-1983), Chilean diplomat and journalist
 Danny Rios (born 1972), American baseball player
 Darren Ríos (born 1995), Puerto Rican footballer
 Darwin Ríos (born 1991), Bolivian footballer
 Diego Javier Llorente Ríos (born 1993) is a Spanish professional footballer who plays as a centre back for Premier League club Leeds United and the Spain national team.
 David Ríos Insua (born 1964), Spanish mathematician
 Diego de los Ríos (1850–1911), Royal Spanish Governor-General of the Philippines
  (born 1945), Mexican lawyer, jurist, and politician.
 Domingo Terán de los Ríos, first Governor of Spanish Texas from 1691 to 1692, Governor of Sonora & Sinaloa from 1681 to 1686
 Don Narciso Fernández de Heredia y Begines de los Ríos (1775–1847) 2nd Count of Heredia-Spínola Grandee of Spain, 1st Marquis of Heredia, Grandee of Spain and iure uxoris Count of Ofalia, Spanish noble, politician and diplomat who served as Prime Minister of Spain and as Minister of State 
 (1942–2007), Paraguayan actress and teacher
 Eddie Rios Mellado (1930-2009), inventor of basketball's three-point-line
 Edwin Rios (born 1994), Puerto Rican baseball player
 Efraín Ríos Montt (born 1926), 26th President of Guatemala
 Elena Páez Ríos (1909-1998), Librarian and author of la Iconografía Hispana (1966-1970) and Repertorio de grabados españoles de la Biblioteca Nacional (1981-1985) 
 Elvira Ríos (1913–1987), Mexican singer and actress
 Emily Rios (born 1989), American actress and model
 Emilia Ríos (born 20 May 1988) is a Chilean politician who currently serves as mayor of Ñuñoa.
 Emilio Botín-Sanz de Sautuola y García de los Ríos (1934-2014), marquess of O'Shea, Spanish billionaire banker
 Emma Ríos (born 1976) Spanish comics artist and illustrator
 Enrique Cornelio Osornio Martínez de los Ríos (1868–1945), Mexican politician and military surgeon
 Ernesto Ríos (born 1975), Mexican new media artist and academic
 Eulalio Ríos Alemán (1935–1980), Mexican swimmer
 Eugenio Montero Ríos (1832-1914) Spanish Prime Minister and President of the Senate of Spain
 Eusebio Ríos (1935-2008), Spanish footballer and manager
 Evette Rios, American lifestyle expert, writer and television host
 Fabiana Ríos (born 1964), Argentine politician
 Fernando de los Ríos (1879-1949), Spanish Minister of Justice, Minister of State, and politician
 Felipe Ríos (born 1992), Chilean tennis player
 Filiberto Ojeda Ríos (1933–2005), Puerto Rican separatist
 Fabian Rios (actor) (born 1980), Colombian actor and model
 Fabián Ríos (politician) (born 1964), Argentine politician
 Fernando de los Ríos Urutti (8 December 1879 – 31 May 1949) was a Spanish professor of Political Law and Socialist politician who was in turn Minister of Justice, Minister of Education and Foreign Minister between 1931 and 1933 in the early years of the Second Spanish Republic
 Francesco de Los Rios (born in Brussels,Belgium 1689-1775) German Count and Field Marshal of the German Empire.
 Francisco Lopez de los Ríos y Cerón 1st Rios Countess of Gavia, with generations following.
 Francisco Ríos, Mexican baseball pitcher
 Francisco Giner de los Rios (1839–1915), Spanish philosopher and educator
 Gabriel Ríos (born 1978), Belgian singer
 Genoveva Ríos (1865-?), Bolivian hero
 Gonzálo Ríos (born 1992), Argentine footballer
 Gonzalo Güell y Morales de los Ríos (1895-1985), Cuban politician and diplomat
 Guido Manini Ríos (born 1958), Uruguayan politician and retired general officer who served as Commander-in-Chief of the National Army
 Guillermo Ríos Alcalá, Mexican restoration expert and educator
 Héctor Ríos Ereñú (1930–2017), Argentine military officer and Chief of Defense Staff
 Hernando de los Ríos Coronel (1559–1621?), mathematician, cosmographer, cartographer, navigator, naval pilot, administrator, soldier, priest, advocate (Procurator General) at the Spanish court of the inhabitants of The Philippines (from 1606-1610 and again from 1618 till his death)
 José Ignacio Gregorio Comonfort de los Ríos (1812-1863), 25th President of Mexico 
 Jacobo Rios Rodriguez, international law scholar
 Jaime Botín-Sanz de Sautuola y García de los Ríos (born 1936), Spanish billionaire heir, banker and art collector
 Jaime Rios (boxer), Panamanian boxer
 Jaime Rios (judge), American judge
 Jaime Ríos (rower), Spanish rower
 Jansen Rios (born 1991), Filipino basketball player
 Jesús Rios (born 1964), Mexican cyclist
 José Rios (born 1974), Spanish runner
 José Amador de los Ríos  (1818–1878), Spanish intellectual, historian and archaeologist
 José María Castellano Ríos (born 1947) is a Spanish businessman, born in A Coruña, Galicia. Former CEO and Deputy Chairman of the Inditex Group which is one of the largest fashion groups in the world and includes brand stores such as Zara, Massimo Dutti, and Bershka. He also takes part into the strategy of N.M. Rothschild as a senior advisor.
 Jorge González Ríos (1964) is a Chilean singer-songwriter, best known for being the leader, vocalist, writer and bassist of the band Los Prisioneros, considered by many to be the most popular rock band in the country.
 Josef de Mendoza y Ríos (1761–1816), Spanish astronomer and mathematician
 Juan Cancel Ríos (1925–1992), Puerto Rican politician and senator
 Juan Ríos (baseball) (1942–1995), Puerto Rican baseball player
 Juan Ríos (actor) (born 1972), Mexican television actor
 Julián Ríos (born 1941), Spanish writer
 Julio Ríos Gallego (born 1973), Colombian engineer, lecturer, mentor, professor of Mathematics and Physics
 Julio García Fernández de los Ríos (1894–1969), Spanish horse rider
 Julián Ríos (born 1941), Spanish writer
 Kevin Ríos (born 1993), Colombian cyclist
 Lalo Rios (1927–1973), Mexican-born American actor
 Leonel Rios (born 1983), Argentine footballer
 Leopoldo Torres Ríos (1899–1960), Argentine film director and screenwriter
 Lucas Rios Marques (born 1988), or simply Lucas, Brazilian footballer
 Juan Antonio Ríos (1888–1946), Chilean lawyer, political figure and 24th President of Chile
 Luigi Sante Da Rios (1881–1965) mathematician and physicist
 Luigi da Rios (1843–1892), Italian painter
  (1776-1853), Spanish painter
 Luisa Martel de Los Rios (1535-1593) conqueror, member of the families that undertook trips in the conquest of America
 Luz Rios, Mexican-born American pop singer and songwriter
 María Francisca de Silva y Gutiérrez de los Ríos, 11th Duchess of the Infantado (1707–1770), Spanish noblewoman
 Marcelo Ríos (born 1975), Chilean tennis player
 Margarita Rios (born 1976) Mayor of Norwalk, California
  (born 1973), lawyer, poet, and jurist who serves as an Associate Justice of the Supreme court of Mexico
 María Fernanda Ríos (born 1982), Ecuadorian entertainer
 Mariana Rios (born 1985), Brazilian actress and singer
 Mariá Álvarez Rios (1919–2010), Cuban composer, pianist and educator
 Mario Ríos Santander (born 1945) is a philosophy professor, businessman, land owner and a Chilean politician
Marlene Dobkin de Rios (1939–2012), American cultural anthropologist, medical anthropologist, and psychotherapist
 , Spanish noble title given to Francisco Esteban Rodríguez de los Ríos 
 Mark Rios (RIOS) A World Renowned Multi-Disciplinary Design/Architectural Firm based out of Los Angeles, Ca.
 Manu Ríos (born 17 December 1998), known professionally as Manu Ríos, is a Spanish actor, model and singer
 Manuel de Godoy Álvarez de Faria Ríos (May 12, 1767 - October 4, 1851) Prince of Spain, 1st Duke of Alcudia, 1st Duke of Sueca, 1st Baron of Mascalbo
 Michael Ríos (born 1985), Chilean footballer
 Miguel Ríos (born 1944), Spanish singer
 Francisco Giner de los Ríos (1839–1915), philosopher and educator
 Osvaldo Ríos (born 1960), Puerto Rican actor and model
 Pedro Ríos (born 1981), Is a Spanish former professional footballer
 Drummer boy of Tacuarí (Pedro Ríos) (1798–1811), better known as the Tambor de Tacuarí, Drummer boy of Tacuarí, was a boy soldier who  was killed in action while encouraging the troops at the battle of Tacuari. The drummer of Tacuarí became an iconic figure of the Argentine War of Independence.
 Pedro de los Ríos y Gutiérrez de Aguayo (died 1547), Royal Spanish governor of Castilla del Oro
 Pedro de los Ríos (died 1563–1565), Domician missionary in Mexico in the mid-16th century
  (1879-1958), Uruguayan politician, lawyer, and journalist
 Pedro Antonio Ríos Reyna (1905-1971), Venezuelan classical musician
 Pedro Messía de la Cerda y de los Ríos (1700-1783) Nobleman and Sailor, 5th Marquis of la Vega de Armijo, Lieutenant General of the Real Armada and 5th Viceroy of Nueva Granada
  (born 1970), Mexican politician, Public Administration Minister
 Rafael Ríos Rey (1911–1980), Puerto Rican muralist
 Raúl Ríos (born 1993), Puerto Rican sailor
 Rebecca Rios (born 1967), American politician
 René Ríos Boettiger (1911–2000), also known as Pepo, Chilean cartoonist, creator of the character Condorito
 Ricardo de los Ríos (1846, Valladolid - May 1929, Madrid) was a Spanish painter, engraver, etcher and illustrator. He spent most of his early career in Paris.
 Ricardo Castro Rios (1920–2001), Spanish-Argentine film actor
 Rodrigo Ríos Lozano (born 1990) commonly known as Rodri, Spanish footballer
 Roberto Álvarez Ríos (born 1932), Cuban artist
 Roberto Ríos (born 1971), Spanish footballer
 Rocío Ríos (born 1969), Spanish long-distance runner
 Rodrigo Ríos (born 1977), Chilean footballer
 Rodrigo Amador de los Ríos Cabezón (1894-1936), Spanish officer and recipient of the Medalla Militar individual,  la Medalla de Marruecos & de Sufrimiento por la Patria.
 Rosa María Ortiz Ríos (1955-2020), Peruvian lawyer and politician who served as Minister of Energy and Mines
 Rosa Rios (born 1965), Treasurer of the United States of America, businesswoman, executive and entrepreneur
 Rossana de los Ríos (born 1975), Paraguayan tennis player
 Ronny Rios (born 1990), Mexican-American boxer
 Sandy Rios (born 1949), President of the conservative political action group Culture Campaign, and a talk radio host
 Sixto Pondal Ríos (1907–1968), Argentine screenwriter, poet, and dramatist
 Sixto Ríos (1913–2008), Spanish mathematician
 Tere Ríos (1917–1999), American writer
 Victor Arriagada Rios (1934-2012), Chilean cartoonist
 Willie Ríos (born 1949), Puerto Rican middle-distance runner
 Waldo de los Rios (1934–1977), Argentine composer, conductor and arranger
 Yacksel Ríos (born 1993), Puerto Rican baseball player
 Yolanda Ríos (1951–2012), Venezuelan-Spanish actress
 Zury Ríos (born 1968), Guatemalan politician

See also
 
 Los Rios District, the oldest continually occupied neighborhood in the state of California
 Rios, Texas, an unincorporated community in Duval County, Texas
 Juan José Ríos, Sinaloa, a city in Northern Sinaloa, Mexico
 Entre Ríos Province, Argentina
 Coto Ríos, a village in the northeastern part of Jaén Province, Spain
 Rios-Caledonia Adobe, a California Historical Landmark and on the National Register of Historic Places
 Dos Rios (disambiguation)
 Palace of los Ríos y Salcedo, a palace located in Soria, Spain
 Ríos Rosas (Madrid), a neighborhood of Madrid belonging to the district of Chamberí, named for Antonio de los Ríos Rosas
 Riós, a municipality in the Spanish province of Ourense, in the autonomous community of Galicia
 Codex Ríos, an Italian translation and augmentation of a Spanish colonial-era manuscript, Codex Telleriano-Remensis
 Los Ríos (disambiguation)
 Rio (disambiguation)

References

Spanish-language surnames